Md. Ashfaqul Islam is a judge of the Appellate Division, Supreme Court of Bangladesh.

Early life 
Islam was born on 15 July 1959. His father was A. K. M. Nurul Islam, former Vice President of Bangladesh. He completed his bachelor's degree and masters in law from the University of Dhaka.

Career 
Islam became a lawyer of the district court in 1983.

In 1985, Islam became a lawyer of the High Court Division of the Bangladesh Supreme Court.

On 27 August 2003, Islam was appointed an additional judge of the High Court Division.

Islam was made a permanent judge of the High Court Division 27 August 2005.

On 14 December 2010, Islam and Justice SM Emdadul Hoque issued a verdict against Gulshan Club ordering them to pay taxes and rejected it's claim to tax exempt status.

On 21 June 2011, Islam and Justice M. Moazzam Husain issued a contempt of court ruling against the government of Bangladesh for preventing Barrister Nasir Uddin Asim, a Bangladesh Nationalist Party politician, and his family from leaving the country despite securing a verdict of the High Court Division that asked the government not to obstruct him from travelling abroad.

On 3 August 2013, Justices Quazi Reza-Ul Hoque and A B M Altaf Hossain summoned Jamaluddin Ahmed, Chairman of Biman Bangladesh Airlines, for not upgrading the seats of High Court Division Judges Md Ashfaqul Islam and Quazi Reza-Ul Hoque from economy class to business class.

On 7 April 2015, Islam and Justice Kashefa Hussain issued contempt of court ruling against Md Mosharraf Hossain, director of Bangladesh Shishu Academy, and Tariqul Islam, Secretary of Ministry of Women and Children Affairs, for failing to return land of Bangladesh Supreme Court occupied by the Shishu Academy.

Islam and Justice KM Kamrul Kader issued a contempt of court ruling on 1 March 2018 against the Director General of Bangladesh Fire Service and Civil Defence, Brigadier General Ali Ahmad Khan, Director General of Bangladesh Railway, Md Amzad Hossain, and Director of Operation and Maintenance Bangladesh Fire Service and Civil Defence Major Shakil Newaz for failure to obey a High Court order directing them to pay compensation to the family of Jihad. Jihad was four year old who fell down a well shaft on 26 December 2014 at Shahjahanpur Railway Colony. The Fire Department was called and they failed to find the boy and declared no one was inside the well. The next day the body of the boy was recovered from the well by locals. On 3 December 2018, Islam and Justice Mohammad Ali rejected a petition by Andaleeve Rahman Partho, Chairman of Bangladesh Jatiya Party, seeking electronic voting machines for election in his constituency of Bhola-1 for the next parliamentary elections.

On 8 December 2020, Islam and Justice Mohammad Ali ordered the government of Bangladesh to remove illegal structures built banks of the Karnaphuli.

Islam and Justice Mohammad Ali issued a verdict against Bangladesh Bank on 18 March for not including more information on the role of President Sheikh Mujibur Rahman. On 13 December 2021, Islam and Justice Iqbal Kabir Lytton upheld the copyright of claim of Sheikh Abdul Hakim, ghost writer of Masud Rana, over 300 books.

On 14 March 2022, Islam and Justice Md Iqbal Kabir ordered the government to take steps to translate laws from English to Bengali. He elevated to the Appellate Division from High Court on December, 2022.

References 

Living people
1959 births
University of Dhaka alumni
20th-century Bangladeshi lawyers
Supreme Court of Bangladesh justices
21st-century Bangladeshi judges